Harry Birkhead (1931-2013) was a South African philatelist who signed the Roll of Distinguished Philatelists of South Africa in 1982 and was a Fellow of The Royal Philatelic Society London. He was Honorary Life President of the Philatelic Federation of South Africa.

Harry was a specialist in the stamps and postal history of the Anglo-Boer War and the Rhodesias. His Rhodesian collection was sold by Christie's Robson Lowe in 1986.

Selected publications
The wherewithal of Wolmaransstad, Philatelic Federation of South Africa, 1999. (With John Groenewald & Richard Stroud) 
The pseudo-siege of Schweizer-Reneke, Philatelic Federation of South Africa, 2005. (With John Groenewald) 
The riddle of Rustenburg, Philatelic Federation of South Africa, 2007. (With John Groenewald) 
The legacy of Lydenburg, Philatelic Federation of South Africa, 2009. (With John Groenewald)

References

External links
https://web.archive.org/web/20130517102013/http://forum.bidorbuy.co.za/stamp-collecting-philatelic-forum/18380-r-i-p-harry-birkhead.html

Fellows of the Royal Philatelic Society London
2013 deaths
South African philatelists
Philately of South Africa
1931 births